The Stardust Dream Director Award is chosen by a distinguished jury as part of the annual Stardust Awards.

Karan Johar holds this record by winning 3 awards, followed by Ashutosh Gowariker and Farah Khan with 2 awards.

List of winners

References

See also 
 Stardust Awards
 Bollywood
 Cinema of India

Stardust Awards